Miming in pop music may refer to:
Lip-syncing, matching lip movements with sung or spoken vocals
Miming in instrumental performance, pretending to play an instrument during a pop concert